Mills Darden (October 7, 1799 – January 23, 1857) was an American who became famous as one of the largest men ever in human history. His enormous size both in terms of his body weight and height made him one of the biggest humans to have ever lived.

Mills (or Miles) Darden was born on October 7, 1799, near Rich Square, North Carolina, United States, to John and Mary Darden. He was married at least once and had several children.
 
He died on January 23, 1857. He was buried in Lexington, Tennessee. His grave, and his wife's, have been restored by the local Development Authority.

See also
List of the heaviest people
List of tallest people

References

1798 births
1857 deaths
People from Rich Square, North Carolina